Avdullah Hoti (born 4 February 1976) is a Kosovan politician, who served as the prime minister of Kosovo from 3 June 2020 until 22 March 2021. He previously served as the minister of Finance of Kosovo between 2014 and 2017 in the PDK/LDK coalition government.

In September 2020, Hoti signed the agreement on normalisation of economic relations with Serbia and accession to the Mini Schengen Zone, as well as on mutual recognition between Kosovo and Israel and the establishment of diplomatic relations. He has an active role in the European Union-mediated negotiations between the governments of Serbia and Kosovo.

Political career 
He joined the political party LDK in 2006. He was elected as vice president of Pristina (Kosovo's capital) in the 2008 communal elections. He served until the next communal elections in 2013, when his party lost the city. In the next year, he was a candidate in the parliamentary elections as Minister of Finance and he was elected. He served in that position until 2017 when the government was voted out by a no-confidence motion. Then, he was the coalition's candidate for Prime Minister of Kosovo in the Kosovan parliamentary election of 2017. He became the head of the LDK parliamentary group from 2017 until 2020, when he took office as First Deputy Prime Minister. He was nominated by the LDK to be his party's nominee for PM after the Kurti government failed a confidence vote, but his eligibility to be PM was questioned by Albin Kurti and his party on the grounds that one cannot form a government without first having the party that won the election enter government, and they demanded new elections. However, on 28 May 2020, the Constitution Court of Kosovo gave the right to the second party and Avdullah Hoti to form a government without elections. After the party that won the elections failed again to form a new government, the Court argued that Avdullah Hoti was eligible to proceed to be voted on by the Parliament as the new PM of the Republic of Kosovo. On 3 June 2020, Hoti was elected Prime Minister with 61 votes in favor, 24 against and one abstention.

On 2 August 2020, Hoti announced on his Facebook page that he was diagnosed with COVID-19 suffering mild symptoms, and that he would work from home in the coming two weeks.

On September 4, 2020, Hoti and Aleksandar Vučić, President of Serbia, signed an agreement on the normalisation of economic relations between Serbia and Kosovo at the White House in the presence of Donald Trump, President of the United States. The deal will encompass freer transit, including by rail and road, while both parties agreed to work with the Export–Import Bank of the United States and the U.S. International Development Finance Corporation and to join the Mini Schengen Zone, but the agreement also included mutual recognition between Israel and Kosovo.

On 21 December 2020, the constitutional court of Kosovo ruled that the vote of lawmaker Etem Arifi, of the minority Ashkali Party for Integration, for the Cabinet of Prime Minister Avdullah Hoti was invalid and consequently "the Government did not have the majority of the votes of the lawmakers.” Arifi's vote gave the government 61 votes in the 120-seat chamber, and without it the vote would have failed. As a result, Kosovo went to snap elections and the Hoti government continued as a caretaker one until the elections were held.

Countries visited 
List of official visits abroad made by Avdullah Hoti as Prime Minister:

Notes

References

External links

 

|-

|-

1976 births
Living people
Kosovan Muslims
Kosovo Albanians
People from Orahovac
University of Pristina alumni
Alumni of Staffordshire University
Prime ministers of Kosovo
Deputy Prime Ministers of Kosovo
Finance ministers of Kosovo
Government ministers of Kosovo
Democratic League of Kosovo politicians